Aye Aye Moe  (born 4 February 1995) is a Burmese women's footballer who was a defender for the Myanmar women's national football team at the 2014 AFC Women's Asian Cup and 2016 AFF Women's Championship.

See also
List of Myanmar women's international footballers

References

1995 births
Living people
Burmese women's footballers
Myanmar women's international footballers
Place of birth missing (living people)
Women's association football defenders
Competitors at the 2019 Southeast Asian Games
Southeast Asian Games medalists in football
Southeast Asian Games bronze medalists for Myanmar